Lake Lizhmozero is a lake located in Kondopozhsky District, Republic of Karelia,  Russia. It covers an area of 84.8 square kilometers, a length of 18.6 kilometers and a maximum width of 7.3 kilometers. The average depth of the lake is 5.4 and the maximum depth is 22 meters.

References

LLizhmozero
Lakes of the Republic of Karelia